Michael Lobel is an art historian and critic. He is a professor at Hunter College and The Graduate Center, CUNY. Lobel has taught at Bard College and SUNY Purchase. He was awarded the 28th Annual Eldredge Prize by the Smithsonian American Art Museum for his book John Sloan: Drawing on Illustration in 2016. Lobel attended Wesleyan University and received his PhD in art history from Yale University.

Lobel has received grants and fellowships from the Henry Luce Foundation/American Council of Learned Societies, the Dedalus Foundation, the Rockwell Center for American Visual Studies, and the Getty Research Institute. In 2012, he was the Terra Foundation Visiting Professor at the Institut National d’Histoire de l’Art in Paris. He is a regular contributor to exhibition catalogues and to such publications as Artforum, Art in America, and Art Bulletin.

Works 
 Image Duplicator: Roy Lichtenstein and the Emergence of Pop Art  (Yale University Press, 2002).
 James Rosenquist: Pop Art, Politics and History in the 1960s  (University of California Press, 2010). 
 John Sloan: Drawing on Illustration (Yale University Press, 2014).

References 

American art historians
Hunter College faculty
Living people
Bard College faculty
State University of New York at Purchase faculty
Wesleyan University alumni
Yale University alumni
Year of birth missing (living people)